Red Lick Independent School District is a public school district based in Red Lick, Texas (USA).  Red Lick ISD also serves a small portion of the towns Leary and Texarkana.

The district has two campuses - Red Lick Elementary (Grades K-4) and Red Lick Middle (Grades 5-8).

In 2009, the school district was rated "exemplary" by the Texas Education Agency.

References

External links
Red Lick Independent School District website

School districts in Bowie County, Texas
Texarkana, Texas